Baarle-Nassau is a municipality and town in the southern Netherlands, located in the province of North Brabant. The town is the site of a complicated borderline between Belgium and the Netherlands, with  22 small exclaves of the Belgian town Baarle-Hertog, some of which contain counter-exclaves of Nassau.

Geography

The border with Baarle-Hertog, Belgium
Baarle-Nassau is closely linked, with complicated borders, to the Belgian exclaves of Baarle-Hertog.  Baarle-Hertog consists of 26 separate parcels of land. Apart from the main parcel, known as Zondereigen and located north of the Belgian town of Merksplas, there are 22 Belgian exclaves in the Netherlands and three other parcels on the Dutch-Belgian border. There are also six Dutch exclaves located within the largest Belgian exclave, one within the second-largest, and an eighth within Zondereigen. The smallest Belgian parcel, H7, locally named , measures .

The border's complexity results from numerous medieval treaties, agreements, land-swaps and sales between the Lords of Breda and the Dukes of Brabant. Generally speaking, predominantly agricultural or built environments became constituents of Brabant, while other parts devolved to Breda. These distributions were ratified and clarified as a part of the borderline settlements arrived at during the Treaty of Maastricht in 1843.

For clarification and the interest of tourists, the border is made visible on all streets with iron pins. This way it is always clear whether one is in Belgium (Baarle-Hertog) or in the Netherlands (Baarle-Nassau). This is also visible on the house numbers: the style of house numbers is different in both countries, and often one will find the Dutch or Belgian flag next to the number.

Localities
Baarle-Nassau (population: 5,330)
Ulicoten (1,110)
Castelré (140)

List of enclaves

Netherlands enclaves
These are all part of Baarle-Nassau municipality.
</onlyinclude>
</onlyinclude>
</onlyinclude>

Belgian enclaves
These are all part of Baarle-Hertog municipality, and are surrounded by Baarle-Nassau municipality (Netherlands).
</onlyinclude>
</onlyinclude>
</onlyinclude>

Education 
Baarle-Nassau has two primary schools: Basisschool De Uilenpoortand and Bernardusschool, the latter in the Ulicoten section. There is a single secondary school in Baarle-Nassau, De La Salle, which has , lower , and  levels.

It has a joint library with Baarle-Hertog with Belgian and Dutch staff.

Notable people 

 Petrus Christus ( in Baarle – 1475/1476) an Early Netherlandish painter; was a leading painter after the death of Jan van Eyck
 Jan Hendrikx (born 1944) a former Dutch politician, mayor of Baarle-Nassau 1990 to 2012

Gallery

References

External links

Official Web site Baarle-Nassau 
Official Web site Baarle-Hertog 
The Baarle Enclaves outlined with Maps
Photograph of H-22, the smallest enclave of B.-Hertog
Baarle-Nassau / Baarle-Hertog (with maps)
Photos from Baarle-Nassau/Hertog
English Website about the Baarle Enclaves / with maps [Dead link]
Dutch pages about Baarle-Hertog and Baarle-Nassau / with maps

 
Belgium–Netherlands border crossings
Enclaves and exclaves
Municipalities of North Brabant
Twin cities